Hafþór Júlíus Björnsson (transliterated as Hafthor in English, born 26 November 1988), is an Icelandic professional strongman who is widely regarded as one of the greatest strength athletes of all time. He is the first and only person to have won the Arnold Strongman Classic, the Europe's Strongest Man, and the World's Strongest Man competitions in the same calendar year and holds numerous Strongman titles from multiple strength federations, including multiple world records. With 30 international competition wins, he is the third most decorated strongman in history, behind Lithuania's Žydrūnas Savickas and Poland's Mariusz Pudzianowski, and in terms of pure brute strength, many strength analysts and strongman experts regard Hafþór as "the strongest man to have ever lived".

Hafþór has also appeared in television as an actor, portraying "The Mountain" Ser Gregor Clegane in the HBO series Game of Thrones for five seasons. He is often simply referred to as "Thor" or "The Mountain", as the latter has been closely identified with that character due to his own massive size.

In March 2023, Hafþór was inducted into the International Sports Hall of Fame.

Early life
Hafþór was born on 26 November 1988 in Reykjavík, Iceland. When he was eleven years old, his family moved to Kópavogur. He received his primary education at Grundaskóli and then Hjallaskóli hill school, but due to high levels of energy as a child, he had difficulty sitting in a classroom or concentrating on his studies. As a student at the polytechnic school in Breiðholt, he was enthusiastic about sports and played soccer and did gymnastics, before discovering his passion for basketball in eighth grade. He was also a chess player, with a Blitz rating of 800. He also loved playing video games.

A lanky teenager, Hafþór gained size and strength through daily exercise, combining basic movements (push-ups, chin-ups, and sit-ups) with working at his grandfather's farm during summers and lifting natural stones in the wilderness. His imposing height of 205 cm (6 ft 9 in) is credited to his 203 cm (6 ft 8 in) father, Björn Þor Reynisson, and his mother, Ragnheiður Juliusdottir, who is also of tall stature. Hafþór's grandfather Reynir Ásgeirsson is also very tall and just as broad across the chest. Hafþór has two sisters: Bryndís Björg Björnsdóttir and Hafdís Lind Björnsdóttir.

Basketball career

Hafþór began his athletic career as a basketball player, playing as a center with a bodyweight of around 105 kg (231 lb). He started his senior team career for the Icelandic 1. deild karla club Breiðablik in 2004. The following season, he transferred to FSu Selfoss, but after about ten games, it was discovered that he had been playing with a broken bone in his ankle and required surgery. After recovering, in 2006, Hafþór moved to KR in the Icelandic top-tier Úrvalsdeild. However, after a screw in his ankle shattered, he had to undergo a second surgery in November, forcing him to miss the rest of the season.

To commence the 2007–2008 season, Hafþór moved back to play for FSu Selfoss and averaged 6.7 points per game, helping the team to achieve a promotion to the Úrvalsdeild. Unfortunately, the troublesome ankle continued and ultimately forced him to retire from basketball at the age of nineteen, shattering his dream of making it to the NBA one day.

Between 2004 and 2006, Hafþór played 32 games for the Icelandic junior national basketball teams and 8 with Iceland's U-18 national team in Division A of the U18 European Championship. In May 2004, he won the Nordic championship with the U-16 team. During the 2004 FIBA Europe Under-16 Championship Division B, he helped Iceland achieve promotion to Division A. In 2006, he won the Nordic championship again, this time with the U-18 team.

Strongman career

After recovering from the ankle injury, and inspired by Ronnie Coleman and Dorian Yates, Hafþór trained like a bodybuilder. One day, when four-time World's Strongest Man champion Magnús Ver Magnússon spotted the twenty-year-old, 6 ft 9 in, 140 kg (308 lb) Hafþór deadlifting in his gym, "Jakaból", he immediately realized his potential as a good prospect for strongman, which paved the way for Hafþór to train with Stefán Sölvi Pétursson, Benedikt Magnússon, Páll Logason, and Ari Gunnarsson.

The following year, while training at the "Strongman Base" gym, Hafþór was nicknamed Ljónið (the Lion) by Stefán Sölvi Pétursson, because he continuously grew bigger and got stronger, eventually reaching his heaviest body weight ever, of 210 kg (463 lb), in 2012.

Iceland's Strongest Man
With his newfound friendships and guidance, Hafþór progressed in the sport and went on to win several strongman contests in Iceland multiple times from 2009 onwards, including Westfjord's Viking, Eastfjord Strongman Championships, Highland Viking, Iceland's Strongest Viking, OK Badur Strongman Championships, Akranes Strength Challenge, and Strongest Man in Iceland. After placing third behind his friends Pétursson and Magnússon in 2010, Hafþór won his first Iceland's Strongest Man title (Iceland's most prestigious) in 2011, becoming the ninth Icelander to win the title since its inception, in 1985. His winning streak continued, and in August 2020, Hafþór won the Iceland's Strongest Man for the tenth consecutive time.

Strongman Champions League
Hailing from its IFSA roots, the Strongman Champions League organized several Grand Prix events, which attracted many athletes from around the world. It gave Hafþór the opportunity for international exposure, competing against the best strongmen in the world. From 2013 to 2015, he competed prolifically (up to fourteen competitions in a single year) throughout many Grand Prix competitions in Germany, Netherlands, Finland, Norway, Serbia, Croatia, Bulgaria, Latvia, Russia, China, Malaysia, and Brazil, winning eight international titles, three silver medals, and two bronze medals.

Europe's Strongest Man
After placing fifth and fourth in 2012 and 2013, respectively, Hafþór won the 2014 Europe's Strongest Man competition in Leeds, organized by Giants Live. During the competition, after setting a new world record in the Atlas stones event, he famously answered the reporter, "I'm the future of strength, and I'm king of the stones!" Hafþór successfully defended his title in 2015, but in 2016, despite doing well in other events, he made a mistake at the car walk by gripping the apparatus from the center instead of the sides, which compromised his balance; he eventually lost the title to Englishman Laurence Shahlaei. He regained it in 2017, after an iconic battle with Eddie Hall, and famously answered Bill Kazmaier, "This is not a beauty contest, this is Strongman!" He successfully defended the crown again in 2018 and 2019, becoming a five-time Europe's Strongest Man Champion.

In addition to his five titles, Hafþór has also won the 2014 Giants Live FitX Melbourne, 2014 World's Strongest Viking, 2015 Giants Live Viking, and 2015 Giants Live Sweden, making him the greatest Giants Live champion of all time, with nine wins.

World's Strongest Man
Hafþór took part in World's Strongest Man after earning a wild card invitation to the 2011 contest and placed sixth. At 22 years and 300 days, he is the fourth-youngest WSM finalist in history. Taking part again in ensuing years, he placed third in 2012, 2013, and 2015, and finished runner-up in 2014 to Žydrūnas Savickas by half a point, again in 2016 to Brian Shaw by two points, and finally in 2017 to Eddie Hall by one point, before becoming the World's Strongest Man in 2018, winning the competition by six-and-a-half points over the runner-up, Mateusz Kieliszkowski. Hafþór was also the third Icelander to win the title, after Jón Páll Sigmarsson and Magnús Ver Magnússon.

In his attempt to defend the title, Hafþór suffered a torn plantar fascia during the group stages and emerged in third place overall, behind Martins Licis and Mateusz Kieliszkowski, after doing all the events of the final while suffering from the injury, thus achieving the longest continuous podium streak in World's Strongest Man history with eight (2012–2019). Hafþór has also won more vehicle pulls, stone events, and medleys and loading races than any other competitor in the history of the competition. Among the past winners who have managed to qualify for the finals at a 100% ratio, Hafþór and Mariusz Pudzianowski top the list, with nine finals out of nine appearances. In May 2020, Hafþór stated that he would not return to Giants Live or World's Strongest Man competitions.

Arnold Strongman Classic
Hafþór entered the Arnold Sports Festival's limelight after winning second place in the 2011 Arnold Amateur competition, which was also his first-ever competition abroad. This paved the way for him to qualify for the Arnold Pro Strongman World Series, eventually winning the Arnold Brazil, Arnold Australia, Arnold South Africa, and Arnold Canada competitions.

Widely recognized as the heaviest and most difficult strongman contest in the world, Hafþór first participated in the Arnold Strongman Classic finals, held annually in Columbus, Ohio, in 2012, placing tenth (last place). But after a continuous progression, placing eighth in 2013, fifth in 2014, seventh in 2015, fifth in 2016, and second in 2017, Hafþór defeated the defending champion, Brian Shaw, and won the 2018 Arnold Strongman Classic, becoming only the seventh person to win the prestigious title.

After successfully defending his crown again in 2020, Hafþór became only the second person in history to win the Arnold Strongman Classic three times in a row, after Žydrūnas Savickas.

World's Ultimate Strongman
In 2018, Hafþór won the inaugural World's Ultimate Strongman, held in Dubai, in a stacked field of twelve athletes. This year also marked the most dominant calendar year in strongman history, with Hafþór winning the Iceland's Strongest Man, Europe's Strongest Man, World's Strongest Man, World's Ultimate Strongman, and the Arnold Strongman Classic.

Also from 2018 onwards, Hafþór significantly increased his static strength under the mentoring of his strength coach since 2016, Sebastian Oreb, and increased his squat to  during training and  during Thor's Powerlifting Challenge. In February 2020, Hafþór deadlifted  for two reps and became the first person in history to deadlift 1,000 lb for two reps. All of the lifts were performed raw (only wraps for squats and straps for deadlifts).

The lift was globally televised live by ESPN, and the Guinness World Records verified it as 'the Heaviest Deadlift of all time'.

In August 2020, Hafþór announced his retirement from strongman competitions.

Rogue Invitational and comeback
After a two-and-a-half-year hiatus from competitive strongman, Hafþór announced his retirement from boxing, having already gone back to strength training. He also indicated his comeback to competitive strongman and powerlifting.

Competitive record

Strongman
Placements: 56 x 1st places, 12 x 2nd places and 11 x 3rd places = 79 x podium finishes from 96 total competitions.
Winning percentage: 46.1% in International circuit & 84% at National circuit
Podium percentage: 75.4% in International circuit & 97% at National circuit
Top 5 percentage: 92.3% in International circuit & 100% at National circuit

Powerlifting
Despite the fact that Hafþór never trained specifically for powerlifting, he did two full competitions during his strongman career and another post-retirement. In the 2011 Íslandsmót tournament, at the age of 22, he totaled 930 kg (2,050 lb) raw, winning second place overall, behind Páll Logason. During the 2018 Thor's Powerlifting Challenge (sanctioned by the 'World Raw Powerlifting Federation'), with only five weeks of casual preparation, Hafþór totaled 1,100 kg (2,425 lb) raw, which was at the time the fifth-highest raw superheavyweight powerlifting total of all time. He won second place for highest bench press, behind Kirill Sarychev, and won first place for the highest squat, highest deadlift, highest total, and highest Wilks score, winning the overall competition. After a two-and-a-half-year hiatus from strength training, Hafþór competed in Thor's Powerlifting Meet 2022 with six weeks of preparation and totaled 970 kg (2,138 lb) raw.

On 13 February 2023, Hafþór officially announced his return to strength sports, stating he will attempt to break the all-time powerlifting total world record at the end of the year.

Personal records

 Deadlift – 
 Squat – 
 Log press – 
 Axle press – 
 Bench press – 
 Cyr Dumbbell – 
 Húsafell Stone –  for 
 Atlas Stones – 5 Stones weighing 120–200 kg (264–441 lb) in 17.54 seconds
 One arm Weight over bar –  over

Legacy
During his ten-year international strongman career, Hafþór won all the major strongman competitions and titles that were available at that time, including World's Strongest Man, Arnold Strongman Classic, Europe's Strongest Man, Strongman Champions League, Giants Live, and World's Ultimate Strongman, and his thirty international wins rank him as the third most decorated strongman of all time. Even though he was noted primarily for his strength in the moving events during the initial years of his career (for example, medleys and loading races, keg-tossing, power stairs, vehicle pulls, and natural stones, which require good stamina and athleticism), Hafþór kept on improving and upscaled his brute strength, which helped him excel in static events, such as deadlifts, squats, log presses, axle presses, circus dumbbells, etc. This made him a well-rounded strongman by the year 2018. Experts consider the three years from that point onwards as the "highest peak performance" of any strongman in history, due to Hafþór's dominance and having no weaknesses at any event. During these three years, the only time Hafþór failed to win a competition was due to an injury, and apart from it, he remained unbeaten. Hafþór's international accolades and winning everything there is in the sport cemented his legacy as one of the greatest strongmen of all time, and due to numerous world records and feats involving brute strength and static lifts, many analysts and strongman experts regard Hafþór as "the strongest man to have ever walked the earth".

Boxing career

On 2 May 2020, after breaking the Deadlift World Record, Hafþór challenged its previous record holder, Eddie Hall, to a boxing match. Despite having no boxing experience whatsoever, Hafþór learned the fundamentals of the sport and made commendable progress under the guidance of his coaches, Billy Nelson and Vilhjálmur Hernandez, and support from his two main sparring partners, Skúli Ármansson and Bill Hodgson. With a stricter diet that differed from his strongman days, Hafþór also transformed himself to suit the new sport, losing  in the process. He started training twice a day (up to five hours per day), with a weekly routine that was segmented into fourteen sessions. They consisted of six boxing training sessions, four strength training sessions (two each for upper and lower body), and four endurance training sessions.

Hafþór's first exhibition match was against ex-WBO European light-heavyweight champion Steven Ward, in January 2021. For his second exhibition match, he faced the 2010 Commonwealth Games Heavyweight Gold Medalist, Simon Vallily, in May 2021. The two fights provided him his first real ring experience. On 18 September 2021, Hafþór faced Canadian professional arm-wrestler Devon Larratt in his first non-exhibition boxing match. Larratt volunteered for the fight when Eddie Hall withdrew, after sustaining a biceps tear during training. Within the first round, the referee was forced to stop the fight, awarding Hafþór the win via TKO (technical knockout).

The Mountain vs. The Beast
On 19 March 2022, after almost two years since its announcement, Hafþór and Hall finally faced each other in Dubai in a fight taglined The Heaviest Boxing Match in History. Hall started the first round with continuous haymakers, but Hafþór kept his composure and stuck to the basics, focusing on a solid jab and better footwork. Once he realized Hall's game plan, Hafþór took control of the fight by bludgeoning and knocking Hall down twice, in rounds three and six. Hall sustained bleeding lacerations on top of both eyes, and Hafþór won the fight via unanimous decision.

Boxing record

Acting career
Hafþór was cast as Ser Gregor "The Mountain" Clegane for the fourth season of the HBO series Game of Thrones in August 2013. This was his first main acting role, and he is the third person to depict the character after Conan Stevens played the role in season 1 and Ian Whyte in season 2, but the first actor to portray Clegane in more than one continuous season, with his appearances in seasons four through eight. He was also cast for the lead role in the Philadelphia Renaissance Faire during their debut season, in 2015. He appeared as 'King Thor', the leader of a Viking raiding party intent on capturing the city of Amman.

In 2018, Hafþór played Mongkut, the main villain in Kickboxer: Retaliation, opposite Alain Moussi and Jean-Claude Van Damme, in a story about a kickboxer (Moussi) who is sedated and taken to a prison in Bangkok, where he is forced to fight a giant for freedom and a large sum of money. In the same year, he also played Big John in the film Operation Ragnarok, about a town in the south of Sweden isolated after a viral outbreak and the trapped Swedes and immigrants uniting to survive an onslaught.

The next year, he starred with Mike Tyson in the action film Pharaoh's War, about a former soldier (Tyson) with a mysterious past leading a group of Egyptian refugees through the desert to protect them from a group of evil mercenaries.

In 2022, Hafþór had a minor role as Thorfinnr the Tooth-Gnasher in the historical epic fantasy The Northman, which starred Alexander Skarsgård, Nicole Kidman, Ethan Hawke, Claes Bang, Anya Taylor-Joy, and Willem Dafoe.

Filmography

Film

Television

Other ventures

Martial arts
Since beginning with boxing, Hafþór has stayed involved in a range of martial arts. In 2020, he appeared on episode ten of Karate Combat, with Bas Rutten and Brazilian jiu-jitsu black belt Josh Palmer, prior to having a training session with Palmer that was released to the public. He then visited Mjolnir MMA to train with UFC veteran Gunnar Nelson in May 2021 and was filmed grappling with the professional fighter. In December 2022, Hafþór met Gordon Ryan prior to his match with Nicky Rodriguez at UFC FightPass Invitational 3 and was filmed having a sparring match with him.

Personal life

Family and relationships
Hafþór has been accused by several ex-girlfriends of domestic violence, including Thelma Björk Steimann (the mother of his daughter), who feared for her life once during a vacation. She pressed charges, but the police investigation found no grounds for action; Hafþór later charged her with slander. However, things escalated to a point where Hafþór was not allowed to see his daughter for three years. The situation settled over the years, and he frequently visits his daughter, Theresa Líf, who resides in Denmark with her mother.

In late 2017, Hafþór began dating Canadian fitness model Kelsey Morgan Henson, whom he met in Alberta during a promotional event for Icelandic Mountain Vodka and touring for the Warwick Strongman Festival. The couple garnered media attention because of their height difference. They married in August 2018, and on 26 September 2020, welcomed a son, Stormur Magni Hafþórsson.

Nutrition
During his Strongman days, Hafþór had to constantly force-feed himself to maintain his size and strength. He used to consume up to 8,000 calories a day during 2012–2017 to maintain a 180–190 kg (397–419 lb) physique and increased it up to 10,000 calories a day in his prime (2018–2020) to maintain a 200–205 kg (441–452 lb) body. As a general rule, his macro balance was 2:2:1 carbs-to-protein-to-fat ratio. A typical breakfast could consist of eggs, bacon, and french toast while a typical lunch may consist of rice, steak (or ground bison or salmon), potatoes, spinach, carrots, and chicken stock. He had six to eight healthy meals a day, with the occasional exception: "one cheat meal once in a while is fine as long as you stay on track the rest of the time".

From mid-2020, Hafþór downsized his caloric intake to around 5,000 calories a day, with a much stricter diet that helped him with his body transformation, to suit boxing.

Health concerns
Hafþór has had occasional sleep troubles in the past after heavy meals, due to his large body weight. In March 2017, he was diagnosed with Bell's palsy, which paralysed half of his face. In an interview, when asked if he had ever used steroids, Hafþór answered: "Yes, I have. When you want to be the best, you do whatever it takes". Hafþór did not provide further information related to the cycles or whether his use of the substances was ongoing; however, he has never failed a drug test during his entire career. Hafþór recovered from Bell's palsy later that year; however, he still has a slight facial droop on the right side.

Endorsements
In 2016, Hafþór co-founded the spirits brand Icelandic Mountain Vodka, which is a seven-time distilled Icelandic vodka. The company also produces gin.

Together with Unnar Helgi Danielsson and Dylan Sprouse, Hafþór is also a co-founder and brand ambassador of 'Thor's Skyr', a traditional Icelandic high-protein cultured dairy product high in probiotics and low in sugar.

Hafþór also owns 'Thor's Power Apparel', a family business retailing branded merchandise via an online shop, and is also a brand ambassador for SodaStream.

References

External links

 
 
 

1988 births
Living people
Icelandic male television actors
Icelandic male weightlifters
Icelandic men's basketball players
Icelandic strength athletes
Centers (basketball)
Úrvalsdeild karla (basketball) players
Sportspeople from Reykjavík
Breiðablik men's basketball players
KR men's basketball players
Twitch (service) streamers